The 1974 Swedish Grand Prix was a Formula One motor race held at the Scandinavian Raceway in Anderstorp on 9 June 1974. It was race 7 of 15 in both the 1974 World Championship of Drivers and the 1974 International Cup for Formula One Manufacturers.

The race was dominated by the two Tyrrell-Cosworth 007s of Jody Scheckter and Patrick Depailler. Depailler took pole position, however Scheckter beat him by 0.380 sec in the race, to score his first Grand Prix win.

Race summary 
After Monaco, there were some new faces in the paddock. Brian Redman retired from Formula One, to be replaced by Bertil Roos whilst Reine Wisell took over at March from Hans-Joachim Stuck, Richard Robarts replaced Arturo Merzario after the Italian was unwell, and Leo Kinnunen made his début. Running with open helmet, as he was accustomed to do when rallying, this marked the last time that a driver did so in Formula One, and the first time a Finn had started a Formula One Grand Prix. Vern Schuppan, the first reserve of Ensign-Ford, started illegally from 26th place on the grid and completed the race before he was disqualified. Tom Belsø crashed his car in practice and with no spare car, Richard Robarts let the Danish driver have his car and did not start himself.

The two Tyrrells of Depailler and Scheckter secured the front row and dominated the race. Ronnie Peterson retired on lap eight with a driveshaft failure, shortly to be followed by Clay Regazzoni with gearbox problems. Niki Lauda and James Hunt had a duel for 20 laps before Hunt got past on lap 66 and began slicing into the Tyrrells' lead at two seconds a lap. In the end, Scheckter held on to take his first race win by 0.38s and Hunt took third place, the Hesketh team's first Formula One points. Graham Hill gained his first championship point since 1972, and the last of his career, whilst Tom Belsø drove to 8th place.

Classification

Qualifying 

 – Schuppan failed to qualify, but took the start of the race illegally.

Race

Championship standings after the race

Drivers' Championship standings

Constructors' Championship standings

Note: Only the top five positions are included for both sets of standings.

References

Swedish Grand Prix
Swedish Grand Prix
Grand Prix
June 1974 sports events in Europe